XHWT-FM is a radio station on 97.7 FM in Culiacán, Sinaloa, Mexico. It is owned by Radio TV México and is known as W Radio with a talk format.

History
XEWT-AM 1200 received its concession on November 28, 1988. It operated as a 1,000-watt daytimer, later broadcasting at night with 250 watts.

XEWT migrated to FM in 2010 as XHWT-FM 97.7.

References

Radio stations in Sinaloa
Mexican radio stations with expired concessions